Sir Charles MacCarthy, 1st Viscount of Muskerry (died 1641), also called Cormac Oge, especially in Irish, was from a family of Irish chieftains but acquired a noble title under English law, becoming Viscount Muskerry instead of Lord of Muskerry. He sat in the House of Lords in both Irish parliaments of King Charles I. He opposed Strafford, the king's viceroy in Ireland, and in 1641 contributed to his demise by submitting grievances to the king. Muskerry died during this mission to London and was buried in Westminster Abbey.

Birth and origins 

 
 

Charles, also called Cormac, was probably born in the 1570s in County Cork, southern Ireland. Living in a bilingual context, he had two names, Charles in English and Cormac in Irish. He was the eldest son of Cormac MacDermot MacCarthy and his wife Mary Butler. As his father's name also was Cormac, he was distinguished as "Cormac oge", using the Irish generational suffix "oge", the younger, whereas his father usually included the patronymic "MacDermot" (son of Dermot) in his name. MacDermot (Charles's father) was the 16th Lord of Muskerry. MacDermot had conformed to the established religion, in other words: become a Protestant, by adhering to the Church of Ireland. Charles's father's family were the MacCarthys of Muskerry, a Gaelic Irish dynasty that had branched from the MacCarthy-Mor line in the 14th century when a younger son received Muskerry as an appanage. 

Charles's mother was the second daughter of Theobald Butler, 1st Baron Cahir. His mother's family was a cadet branch of the Butler Dynasty, which was Old English and descended from Theobald Walter, who had been appointed chief butler of Ireland by King Henry II in 1177. He was one of four siblings, who are listed in his father's article.

MacCarthy seems to have been a protestant in his youth but later became Catholic.

First marriage and children 
MacCarthy married Margaret O'Brien in about 1590. She was a daughter of Donogh O'Brien, 4th Earl of Thomond, a protestant. Her family, the O'Briens, were another Gaelic Irish dynasty, descending, in her case, from Brian Boru, a medieval high king of Ireland.

 
Charles and Margaret had two sons:
 Cormac, probably intellectually disabled, died young predeceasing his father
 Donough (1594–1665), 1st earl of Clancarty and 2nd viscount of Muskerry

—and five daughters (in an unordered list as their birth order is poorly known):
 Julia, also called Sheela (died 1633), married Sir Valentine Browne, 1st Baronet of Molahiffe, County Kerry, as his 2nd wife
 Mary, the 2nd daughter, married 1st Sir Valentine Browne, 2nd Baronet of Molahiffe, and had Valentine Browne, 1st Viscount Kenmare as son
 Elena, married John Power and was ancestress of Frances Power, who married Richard Trench and was mother of William Trench, 1st Earl of Clancarty of the 2nd creation.
 Eleanor, married in 1636 Charles MacCarthy Reagh, son of Donal MacCarthy Reagh; they had three sons: Finin, Donal, Donogh, and a daughter, Ellen, who married John de Courcy, 21st Baron Kingsale
 Helen, the 5th daughter, married Colonel Edmund Fitzmaurice, eldest son of the second marriage of Thomas Fitzmaurice, 18th Baron Kerry

Tyrone's Rebellion 
MacDermot (MacCarthy's father) fought in Tyrone's Rebellion, also called the Nine Years' War, which lasted from 1593 to 1603. MacDermot sided with the English and fought the Spanish during the Siege of Kinsale in 1601. Most of MacCarthy's life fell into the subsequent period of almost 40 years of peace in southern Ireland from the Treaty of Mellifont, which ended the Nine Years' War, to the Irish Rebellion of 1641.

Lord and Viscount 
In 1616 MacCarthy succeeded his father as the 17th Lord of Muskerry. Lord Deputy Oliver St John knighted him in 1620. On 15 November 1628 Charles I, King of Ireland, England, and Scotland, created him Baron Blarney and Viscount Muskerry. The titles were probably bought. They had a special remainder that appointed his second son Donough as successor, excluding his eldest son Cormac, who was alive at the time but probably insane.

This is the first creation of the title Muskerry. The title would become extinct with the attainder of the 4th earl in 1691, but would be resurrected in the 2nd creation as Baron Muskerry in favour of Robert Tilson Deane, 1st Baron Muskerry in 1781.

Parliament of 1634–1635 
Muskerry, as he was now, sat in the House of Lords during the two Irish parliaments of King Charles I.

The Irish Parliament of 1634–1635 was opened on 14 July 1634 by the new Lord Deputy of Ireland, Thomas Wentworth (the future Lord Strafford), who had taken office in July 1633. Muskerry attended the Irish Parliament of 1634–1635 at the House of Lords. He took his seat immediately on the day of its opening. Wentworth dissolved parliament on 18 April 1635.

Second marriage 
When his first wife died, Muskerry remarried to Ellen Roche, eldest daughter of David Roche, 7th Viscount Fermoy, a zealous Catholic. It was also her second marriage. She was the widow of Donal MacCarthy Reagh of Kilbrittain, with whom she had had a son called Charles MacCarthy Reagh of Kilbrittain, who had before his father's death, married Eleanor, one of Muskerry's daughters from his first marriage. Muskerry thus married the mother of one of his sons-in-law.

The date of Muskerry's second marriage is disputed. Some propose 1599 or earlier, others 1636 or later. The earlier date is too near (26 years) to his father-in-law's birth in 1573: not enough time for him to grow up and produce an adult daughter.

At some stage, probably after the death of his first wife, Muskerry became Catholic.

Parliament of 1640–1649 
The Irish Parliament of 1640–1649 was opened on 16 March 1640 by Christopher Wandesford, whom Strafford, as Wentworth was now called, had appointed Lord Deputy. Strafford arrived two days later. In its first session the parliament unanimously voted four subsidies of £45,000 (about £ in ) to raise an Irish army of 9000 for use by the King against the Scots in the Second Bishops' War. During the sessions, Muskerry probably stayed at his new townhouse built about 1640 on Dublin's College Green.

On 3 April 1640 Strafford left Ireland. The Commons formed a commission of grievances that gathered evidence for Strafford's misbehaviour. They sent a delegation to Westminster where they submitted the grievances to the King. This delegation included Muskerry's son Donough.

The Lords had not acted on grievances during the third parliamentary session as the Commons had done, but afterwards some of them decided to send Lords Muskerry, Gormanston, Dillon, and Kilmallock to London to submit their grievances to the King. Parliament met again on 26 January 1641. Lord Deputy Wandesford had died on 3 December 1640 and the Irish government had devolved to the Lords Justices, Parsons and Borlase. 
The House of Lords recognised the lords who had gone to London as one of its committees and excused their absence. On 18 February 1641 the lords' grievances were written up in 18 articles. The lords complained that Strafford had overtaxed them.

Death and timeline 
On 20 February 1641 Muskerry died in London during his parliamentary mission. He was buried in Westminster Abbey. Muskerry was succeeded by his second son Donough. As the ailing elder brother had died some time before, the title's special remainder did not need to be invoked. His wdow married Thomas, 4th son of Thomas Fitzmaurice, 18th Baron Kerry.

Notes and references

Notes

Citations

Sources 

 
 
  – 1603 to 1642
 
  – (for MacCarty & Roche)
  – (for Ormond)
  – West Carbery
 
  – 1613 to 1641
  – 1643 to 1660
  – Marriages, baptisms and burials from about 1660 to 1875
 
  – G to K (for Valentine Brown, Earl of Kenmare)
  – L to M (for Muskerry)
  – S to T (for Strafford and Thomond)
  – 1611 to 1625 (for Browne)
  – Canonteign to Cutts (for Clancarty)
  – Moels to Nuneham
  – (Preview)
 
  – Scotland and Ireland
 
 
  – Labdon to Ryves (for MacCarty)
  – (for timeline)
 
 
  – to 1603
 
 
  – 1634 to 1699
 
 
 
 
  – (Preview)
  – Earls (for Kerry)
  – Barons (under Aylmer)
 
 
 
 
 
 
 
  – House of Commons
 
  – Irish stem
 
 
 
 
  – (Preview)
  – Knights bachelors & Index
  – History
 
 
 

 
 

1641 deaths
17th-century Irish people
Burials at Westminster Abbey
MacCarthy dynasty